Lupinus pilosus, commonly known as blue lupine, is a species of flowering plant from the family Fabaceae which is endemic to Israel where it is found in Mediterranean scrubland. The species blooms from February to May. In Israel the Lupinus pilosus has blue flowers with white vertical spot at the middle.

Culinary uses
Around the South Tyrolean village of Altrei (Anterivo), L. pilosus was historically grown. The seeds were roasted and mixed with malt grains and infused in boiling water to produce a coffee-like but caffeine-free hot beverage, Altreier Kaffee ("Altrei coffee"). Interesting not only from a cultural and historical but also from a botanical standpoint, since 2006 a local initiative is re-establishing L. pilosus cultivation in the Altrei region to revive this culinary specialty.

In Israel, the plant is numbered among the few, wild edible plants, but the seeds still require leaching in boiling water several times (with replacement of the water) for the seeds to become palatable. The seeds are then roasted in a skillet with a dash of water, salted, and eaten. Some have it as their practice to pulverize the prepared seeds and to mix them with wheat or sorghum flour for bread.

Gallery

References

External links
 Lupinus pilosus at FlowersInIsrael.com
 Lupinus pilosus תורמוס ההרים at Wildflowers.com (in Hebrew)
 Lupinus pilosus in Israel at Flickr

pilosus
Flora of Israel
Flora of Palestine (region)